D'Marco Marcellus Farr (born June 9, 1971) is a former American football player with the Los Angeles/St. Louis Rams in the National Football League and current sideline reporter for the Los Angeles Rams. Farr played defensive tackle for the Rams from 1994–2000 and recorded 36.5 career sacks. He was a member of the Rams team that won Super Bowl XXXIV.

High school and college
Farr played high school football at John F. Kennedy High School in Richmond, California.  In college, he was a member of the undefeated 1991 University of Washington team that won the CNN/USA Today NCAA National Championship.

NFL career
Farr was signed as an undrafted free agent by the Los Angeles Rams out of the University of Washington in 1994. He had his best season in 1995 when he recorded 11.5 sacks and 1 interception. Farr recorded 8.5 sacks in the Rams' 1999 Super Bowl season.
 Farr was cut by the Rams after the 2000–01 season.

Broadcasting
After his playing career ended, Farr became a regular on the sports talk show The Best Damn Sports Show Period on Fox Sports Net.  He has remained on FSN as a co-host of the network's college football coverage.

From 2005 until September 2007, Farr hosted the D'Marco Farr Show with Kevin Kiley on KSPN in Los Angeles.

  On September 21, 2007, co-host Kevin Kiley announced that Farr had "retired from sports radio" to "pursue opportunities in professional football".

Previously, until November 2006, Farr was the co-host with Gary Miller; however, Miller was fired and replaced by guest hosts until January 2007, when Kevin Kiley joined the show as co-host.

 Farr was a part of the St. Louis Rams broadcasts, doing TV color commentary for KTVI FOX 2 in the preseason, and providing analysis for radio broadcasts during the season, previously for 103.3 KLOU, and from 2008 until 2016, 101.1 WXOS.

He was also a part of the station's afternoon drive program, The Fast Lane, with Randy Karraker and former St. Louis Cardinals pitcher Brad Thompson. From 2009 until 2016, Farr was the lead color commentator for the Rams Radio broadcasts on 101 ESPN. He replaced former coach Jim Hanifan. On August 5, 2016, Farr announced he was leaving 101.1 FM and joining the Los Angeles Rams broadcasting team on KSPN Los Angeles (which consists of J.B. Long and Maurice Jones-Drew).

References

1971 births
Living people
American football defensive tackles
College football announcers
Los Angeles Rams announcers
Los Angeles Rams players
National Conference Pro Bowl players
National Football League announcers
Sportspeople from Richmond, California
St. Louis Rams announcers
St. Louis Rams players
Washington Huskies football players